Intimism may refer to:
 Intimism (art movement), an artistic movement in the late 19th century and early 20th century
 Intimism (poetic movement), a poetic movement that emerged in Slovenia after the end of World War II